Hendrick Ekstein (born 1 January 1991) is a South African footballer who last played as a midfielder for South African Premier Division side AmaZulu.

Club career
Hendrick Ekstein hails from the development of Kaizer Chiefs, he was promoted to the first team in 2014, when he was only 23 years old . Even though Kaizer Chiefs had different coaches during his stint (3), they all saw fit to play him, not regularly of course. But that was not the main reason for his departure. Ekstein left chiefs after negotiations for a new contract fell through, pule felt he deserved a certain amount while Kaizer Chiefs disagreed. He left as a free agent in 2019 and went on to join  Sabah FC.

On 28 June 2019, Ekstein signed a two-year contract with Azerbaijan Premier League side Sabah FC. On 23 December 2019, Ekstein left Sabah by mutual consent. On 21 January 2020, Ekstein signed for fellow Azerbaijan Premier League club Sabail FK.
On 11 September 2020, Ekstein was suspended by Sabail for a breach of discipline.

On 15 July 2021, Ekstein left Sabail after his contract expired.

Career statistics

Club

References

External links
 
 

1991 births
Living people
South African people of Swedish descent
Association football midfielders
South African soccer players
South Africa international soccer players
South African Premier Division players
Azerbaijan Premier League players
Kaizer Chiefs F.C. players
Sabah FC (Azerbaijan) players
Sabail FK players
AmaZulu F.C. players
South African expatriate soccer players
Expatriate footballers in Azerbaijan